Aleksei Igorevich Yudkin (born 20 July 1981) is a former Russian professional football player.

Club career
He played 5 seasons in the Russian Football National League for FC Oryol, FC Avangard Kursk and FC Volga Ulyanovsk.

External links
 
 

1981 births
Living people
Russian footballers
Association football midfielders
FC Oryol players
FC Avangard Kursk players
FC Volga Ulyanovsk players